Motana Dekinda Grama Niladhari Division is a Grama Niladhari Division of the Yatinuwara Divisional Secretariat  of Kandy District  of Central Province, Sri Lanka .  It has Grama Niladhari Division Code 199.

Motana Dekinda is a surrounded by the Balana, Godigamuwa, Dunugama Maliyadda and Makehelwala  Grama Niladhari Divisions.

Demographics

Ethnicity 

The Motana Dekinda Grama Niladhari Division has a Sinhalese majority (98.9%) . In comparison, the Yatinuwara Divisional Secretariat (which contains the Motana Dekinda Grama Niladhari Division) has a Sinhalese majority (89.9%)

Religion 

The Motana Dekinda Grama Niladhari Division has a Buddhist majority (99.6%) . In comparison, the Yatinuwara Divisional Secretariat (which contains the Motana Dekinda Grama Niladhari Division) has a Buddhist majority (88.8%)

Grama Niladhari Divisions of Yatinuwara Divisional Secretariat

References